Sittercity.com is an American online marketplace for families, individuals, and corporate employees wishing to hire local in-home care. Types of caregivers that can be found on Sittercity.com include babysitters, nannies, pet sitters, senior care providers, and housekeepers. The site currently has over 5 million registered caregivers.

References

External links 
 Sittercity.com Website

Online marketplaces of the United States